Cyrus was launched in Kingston upon Hull in 1815. She sailed on annual voyages to Greenland as a whaler until she was lost in July 1823.

Career
Cyrus first entered Lloyd's Register (LR) in 1816.

The following data is from Coltish:

 
Cyrus was reported to have one fish and four tons on 8 June.

Fate
On 8 November 1823 Perseverance, Simpson, master, arrived at Peterhead. She reported that two Hull whalers had been lost, Cyrus, Welburn, master, and Neptune, Munro, master. Cyrus had taken five fish, and Neptune, 19. Cyrus had been lost in July.

Citations and references
Citations

References
 

1815 ships
Age of Sail merchant ships of England
Whaling ships
Maritime incidents in July 1823